Eucalyptus phoenix, commonly known as brumby mallee-gum, is a species of mallee that is endemic to a restricted area in Victoria, Australia. It has smooth white to greyish bark, glossy green, lance-shaped adult leaves, flower buds in groups of between five and eleven, white flowers and hemispherical fruit.

Description
It has smooth white to light grey bark that is shed in thin strips and plates. Flowering occurs from late spring to early summer the flowers are white.

Taxonomy and naming
Eucalyptus phoenix was first formally described in 2013 by Kevin Rule and Susan G. Forrester in the journal Muelleria from material collected near Brumby Point. The specific epithet (phoenix) "commemorates the serendipitous discovery of a small amount of the seed of this rare new plant following the apparently all-consuming fire of 2013." Like the fabled Phoenix of Greek mythology, this species arose from the flames.

Distribution

Conservation status
This species is listed as "endangered" in Victoria.

See also
List of Eucalyptus species

References

Flora of Victoria (Australia)
Trees of Australia
phoenix
Myrtales of Australia
Plants described in 2013